Steve Braun may refer to:

Steve Braun (actor) (born 1976), Canadian television and movie actor
Steve Braun (baseball) (born 1948), American baseball player
Steve Braun (politician) (born  1959), American businessman and politician